The 2004–05 Liga Leumit season saw Hapoel Kfar Saba win the title and promotion to the Premier League. Runners-up Maccabi Netanya were also promoted.

Maccabi Ahi Nazareth (who had been relegated from the Premier League the previous season) and Tzafririm Holon were relegated to Liga Artzit.

Final table

External links
Israel Second Level 2004/05 RSSSF

Liga Leumit seasons
Israel
2004–05 in Israeli football leagues